Rhys Pritchard is an Australian rugby league player who previously played for the Sydney Roosters in the National Rugby League. Pritchard has also played for the Wests Tigers in the Toyota Cup and The Entrance Tigers in the Bundaberg Red Cup. His preferred position is at fullback and he made his debut for the Sydney Roosters in June 2011 against the New Zealand Warriors.

References

External links
NRL player profile

1987 births
Living people
Australian rugby league players
Rugby league fullbacks
Rugby league wingers
Rugby league centres
Rugby league players from Sydney
Sydney Roosters players
Western Suburbs Magpies NSW Cup players
Wyong Roos players